Tony West may refer to:

 Tony West (attorney) (born 1965), American attorney
 Tony West (darts player) (born 1972), English darts player
 Tony West (footballer) (born 1956), former Australian rules footballer

See also
Anthony West (disambiguation)